The Tipra Motha Party (TMP), also known as the Tipraha Indigenous Progressive Regional Alliance, is a regional political party and previously a social organization in Tripura, India. The TIPRA is led by Pradyot Bikram Manikya Deb Barma. It is currently the largest opposition party in Tripura Legislative Assembly

History

On 25 Feb 2019, Pradyot Bikram Manikya Deb Barma was appointed the President of Tripura Pradesh Congress Committee. Within a few months, Deb Barma resigned from the Pradesh Congress President post, accusing the Congress high command of pressuring him to accommodate 'corrupt people'. Almost three months later, he formed a social organization to work for the rights of the indigenous people.

On 5 February 2021, Deb Barma announced that his organization had become a political party and would contest the 2021 Tripura Tribal Areas Autonomous District Council election.

The Indigenous Nationalist Party of Twipra (INPT), Tipraland State Party (TSP) and IPFT (Tipraha) merged with the TIPRA in 2021.

Ideological positions 

TIPRA's main objective is the creation of a new state called 'Greater Tipraland' under the Article 2 & 3 of the Constitution of India. The Motha emphasizes Tipra nationalism, using the slogans "Puila Jati, Ulobo Jati" and "Puila Jati, Ulo Party" (Community first, party later). It aims to first empower and emancipate the Tiprasa people before anything else. The party sees its activities as peoples' movement rather than a political one.

In 2023, Union Home Minister Amit Shah accused the Tipra Motha of being allied with Congress and the CPI (M). This was denied by Deb Barma, who claimed he could not be a communist ally due to his royal ancestry, being the son of the last King of Tripura.

Electoral history 
TIPRA secured a majority in the 28-member Tripura Tribal Areas Autonomous District Council elections along with its ally the Indigenous Nationalist Party of Twipra (INPT). TIPRA won 16 seats while the INPT won 2 seats.

The result not only ended the Left Front’s 15-year rule of the council but also became the only regional party to come into power in the council without an alliance with a national party.

Deb Barma reaffirmed his earlier claim that the demand for Greater Tipraland would not be compromised at any cost and issued a stern call for victory in 2023. A massive gathering of thousands of indigenous people who travelled from all over the state to the Swami Vivekananda Stadium (Astabal Ground) complemented the term "Thansa." "Bubagra is not looking to argue. We abhor all forms of violence. We never oppose any group or faith. Our movement is to demand the rights that the Indian Constitution grants us, and we will succeed in our objectives, he continued.

Politburo members 
 Pradyot Bikram Manikya Deb Barma
 Purna Chandra Jamatia
 Bijoy Kumar Hrangkhawl
 Animesh Debbarma
 Rajeswar Debbarma
 Manindra Reang
 Brishaketu Debbarma
 Biswajit Kalai

See also
Tripura Tribal Areas Autonomous District Council

References 

Organisations based in Tripura
2019 establishments in Tripura
Political parties in Tripura